This is a list of notable events in the history of LGBT (lesbian, gay, bisexual, and transgender) rights that took place in the year 1971.

Events
Frank Kameny becomes the first openly gay candidate for the United States Congress when he runs in the first election for the District of Columbia's non-voting delegate to Congress.
 The Front homosexuel d'action révolutionnaire (Homosexual Front for Revolutionary Action) forms in France.

March
 18 — Idaho decriminalizes homosexual acts between consenting adults, but the repeal is itself repealed before taking effect.
 24 —  In a case granting citizenship to a Cuban man, a federal judge rules that homosexuality alone cannot bar a person from becoming a United States citizen.

April
 1 — The French magazine Tout is seized by police, who characterize its call for sexual liberation in that country an "outrage to public morals".

May
 15
 The first Gay Power march in Europe takes place in Örebro, Sweden, by a group called :sv:Gay Power Club.

July
 1
 The Gay Alliance Toward Equality is founded as Canada's first gay rights organization.
 In the United Kingdom, the International Times loses an appeal on indecency charges for running personal ads for gay men.
 10 — Austria decriminalizes homosexual acts between consenting adults.
 21 — George Klippert is released from prison, two years after homosexuality was decriminalized in Canada.

October
 1 — Connecticut decriminalizes homosexual acts between consenting adults.
 12 — The New York City Department of Consumer Affairs recommends the repeal of a city law banning homosexuals from working in or going to bars.

November
 1 — The Body Politic, Canada's first gay rights magazine, hits newsstands.

December
 14 — The U.S. gay rights activist group Gay Activists Alliance protest in front of the Suffolk County, New York, police headquarters after two members were arrested for sodomy.

See also

Timeline of LGBT history — timeline of events from 12,000 BCE to present
LGBT rights by country or territory — current legal status around the world
LGBT social movements

Notes

References
 Miller, Neil (1995). Out of the Past: Gay and Lesbian History from 1869 to the Present. New York, Vintage Books. .
 Rutledge, Leigh (1992). The Gay Decades. New York: Penguin Books Ltd. .

LGBT rights by year
1971 in LGBT history